The D-Boy Diary: Book 1 is the twenty-third studio album by American rapper E-40. It was released on November 18, 2016, by Heavy on the Grind Entertainment.

Track listing

Charts

References

2016 albums
E-40 albums
Albums produced by Droop-E
Albums produced by Mike Free
Albums produced by Rick Rock
Albums produced by Zaytoven